{{DISPLAYTITLE:C24H29FO6}}
The molecular formula C24H29FO6 may refer to:

 Acrocinonide, a synthetic glucocorticoid corticosteroid
 Fluprednidene acetate, a moderately potent glucocorticoid used in form of a cream to treat skin inflammations